Asterodiscididae is a family of starfish. Members of the family have five short tapering arms and a wide disc. The family was first described by the Australian zoologist F.W.E. Rowe in 1977.

Genera
The following genera are listed in the World Register of Marine Species:

 genus Amphiaster Verrill, 1868
 Amphiaster insignis Verrill, 1868 -- East pacific
 genus Asterodiscides A. M. Clark, 1974
 Asterodiscides belli Rowe, 1977 -- Somalie
 Asterodiscides bicornutus Lane & Rowe, 2009 -- Philippines
 Asterodiscides cherbonnieri Rowe, 1985 -- Madagascar (south)
 Asterodiscides crosnieri Rowe, 1985 -- Madagascar (north)
 Asterodiscides culcitulus Rowe, 1977 -- Western Australia
 Asterodiscides elegans (Gray, 1847) -- Indo-Pacific
 Asterodiscides fourmanoiri Rowe, 1985 -- Madagascar (south)
 Asterodiscides grayi Rowe, 1977 -- Western Australia
 Asterodiscides helonotus (Fisher, 1913) -- Philippines
 Asterodiscides japonicus Imaoka, Irimura, Okutani, Oguro, Oji & Kanazawa, 1991 -- Japan
 Asterodiscides lacrimulus Rowe, 1977 -- Somalia
 Asterodiscides macroplax Rowe, 1985 -- Western Australia
 Asterodiscides multispinus Rowe, 1985 -- North-East Australia
 Asterodiscides pinguiculus Rowe, 1977 -- Western Australia
 Asterodiscides soleae Rowe, 1985 -- Western Australia
 Asterodiscides tessellatus Rowe, 1977 -- Western Australia
 Asterodiscides truncatus (Coleman, 1911) -- South-East Australia and New Zealand
 Asterodiscides tuberculosus (Fisher, 1906) -- Hawaii
 fossile genus Kionaster Blake & Portell, 2011
 fossile Kionaster petersonae Blake & Portell, 2011
 genus Paulia Gray, 1840
 Paulia horrida Gray, 1840 -- Galapagos
 genus Pauliastra Mah, 2021
 Pauliastra aenigma (Ludwig, 1905) -- Costa Rica
 genus Uokeaster Mah, 2021
 Uokeaster ahi Mah, 2021 -- Rapa Nui

References

Valvatida
Echinoderm families